Williamsville is the name of some places:

United States of America
 Williamsville, Kent County, Delaware
 Williamsville, Sussex County, Delaware
 Williamsville, Illinois
 Williamsville, Cass County, Michigan
 Williamsville, Livingston County, Michigan
 Williamsville, Missouri
 Williamsville, Nevada (Ragtown)
 Williamsville, New York
 Williamsville, Vermont
 Williamsville, Virginia
 Williamsville (Studley, Virginia), a historic house

Other
 Williamsville, Cote D'Ivoire
 Williamsville, Dublin, Ireland
 Williamsville, Kingston, Ontario
 Williamsville, Trinidad and Tobago